Hensley Filemon Acasio Meulens (born June 23, 1967), nicknamed "Bam Bam", is a Curaçaoan professional baseball coach and retired player. He is the hitting coach for the Colorado Rockies of Major League Baseball (MLB).

He was the first Curaçaoan to play in both MLB and the Dominican Professional Baseball League.

Hitting home runs left-handed while playing softball as a teenager earned Meulens the nickname "Bam Bam" when his friends compared his power to the Flintstones cartoon character.

Professional career

Early career (1985–1993)
Hensley Meulens was signed by the Yankees as an undrafted free agent in 1985.  After struggling in his first professional season in 1986 with the Gulf Coast Yankees, Meulens made a splash in 1987 with Single-A Prince William, hitting .300 with 28 HR and 103 RBI, also being named to the Carolina League All-Star team.  His hitting cooled somewhat in 1988 and 1989 as he split time between the Double-A Albany-Colonie Yankees of the Eastern League and the Triple-A Columbus Clippers of the International League.

His bat rebounded in 1990 for Columbus as he helped lead the team to the 1990 International League championships (where they ultimately lost to Rochester), hitting .285 with 26 HR and 96 RBI, and was named the 1990 International League MVP.  Meulens' impressive 1990 season earned him a spot on the Yankees roster in 1991, but he was back in Columbus in 1992 to help lead the Clippers to the Governors' Cup Championship.

New York Yankees (1989–1993)
Meulens made his major league debut with the New York Yankees on August 23, 1989.  Meulens never attained a permanent spot on the New York lineup, despite spending the entire 1991 season on the Yankees roster.  Averaging a strike-out every three at bats, Meulens platooned in left field with Mel Hall.  He saw limited action with the Yankees in late-season call-ups in 1992 and  1993.

Japan (1994–1996)
In November 1993, the Yankees sold Meulens' contract to the Chiba Lotte Marines of Nippon Professional Baseball, where he spent the 1994 season, hitting 23 home runs and driving in 69 runs while accumulating 135 strikeouts.  The following season, Meulens signed with the Yakult Swallows, helping lead the Swallows to the 1995 Japan Series championship.

Back to America (1997–2002)
He returned to North America in 1997, and after an unsuccessful tryout with the Atlanta Braves, he reached the Majors again briefly playing with the Montreal Expos (while having a good season for the Expos' AAA affiliate Ottawa Lynx) and Arizona Diamondbacks. Unable to secure a contract with a major league team in 1999, Meulens signed with the Newark Bears of the independent Atlantic League. He made one last stop in Asia, playing 14 games with the SK Wyverns of the KBO League and batting only .196, before heading his professional playing career to the Mexican League with the Saraperos de Saltillo in 2001 and finally retiring, in 2002, after a mid-season injury while playing with the Pericos de Puebla.

International competition
Meulens represented the Netherlands at the 2000 Summer Olympics in Sydney, Australia. His 4th-inning double gave the Cuban team their first Olympic loss in 21 games.  Ultimately, the Netherlands took fifth place in the final standings. He returned to the team as a coach for the 2004 Summer Olympics and the 2009 World Baseball Classic.  Meulens was named to serve as manager for the team during the 2013 World Baseball Classic.

Meulens also played for the Dutch team in the 2001 Baseball World Cup in Taichung, Taiwan and 2002 Intercontinental Cup in Havana, Cuba.

Coaching career
Meulens began his coaching career with the Bluefield Orioles for the 2003 and 2004 seasons. From -, he was the hitting coach of the Indianapolis Indians, the Triple-A affiliate of the Pittsburgh Pirates, also coaching in the Arizona Fall League for the Peoria Saguaros in 2005 and the Hawaii Winter Baseball league for the Honolulu Sharks in the 2006 off-season.  In 2009, Meulens served as hitting coach for the Fresno Grizzlies, the AAA affiliate of the San Francisco Giants of the Pacific Coast League. Meulens reached the Major League ranks as batting coach in 2010, serving as hitting coach for the San Francisco Giants  following the firing of previous hitting coach Carney Lansford. He helped the Giants win a World Series in three of his first five years.  In November 2017, Meulens became one of six candidates interviewed by the New York Yankees for their vacant manager position, following the decision not to renew the contract of Joe Girardi.  The other candidates were Carlos Beltran, Aaron Boone, Rob Thomson, Eric Wedge and Chris Woodward.

Meulens also runs the Dutch Antilles Baseball Academy in Curaçao.
He is reportedly interested in starting a baseball league in Curaçao in association with Major League Baseball's RBI Program.

Meulens was named bench coach of the New York Mets on December 8, 2019, for the 2020 season. Meulens was fired after the season and was replaced by Dave Jauss.

On February 28, 2022, the Yankees announced that Meulens would serve as assistant hitting coach.

On November 7, 2022, the Rockies announced that they had hired Meulens as their hitting coach starting with the 2023 season.

Personal life
Meulens is married to Gyselle Meulens Petronia and has four daughters, 2 from a previous marriage—Michelle Marilise Aimee Meulens-Pasquaretta, Danielle Marie Antonia Meulens-Ebecilio, Mia Valentina Turya, and Evangelina Cristina Vuri. In addition to the two daughters he has with his wife, Gyselle, he also has a son, Elijah Gabriel Ludwig.

Meulens speaks five languages: English, Spanish, Dutch, Papiamento and Japanese.

On April 27, 2012, Meulens was awarded the order of Knight in the Order of Orange-Nassau by Queen Beatrix.  A ceremony was held at AT&T Park on July 13, 2012, where he was introduced as 'Sir' Hensley Meulens.  The award ceremony highlighted his role in victory by The Netherlands in the 2011 Baseball World Cup.

Notes

External links

Statistics at Japanese Baseball

1967 births
Living people
Águilas de Mexicali players
Albany-Colonie Yankees players
Algodoneros de Guasave players
Arizona Diamondbacks players
Azucareros del Este players
Curaçao expatriate baseball players in the Dominican Republic
Baseball players at the 2000 Summer Olympics
Calgary Cannons players
Cangrejeros de Santurce (baseball) players
Columbus Clippers players
Chiba Lotte Marines players
Curaçao baseball players
Curaçao expatriate baseball players in Japan
Curaçao expatriate baseball players in Canada
Curaçao expatriate baseball players in Mexico
Curaçao expatriate baseball players in the United States
Curaçao expatriate baseball people in the United States
Dutch expatriate baseball players in South Korea
Dutch people of Curaçao descent
Fort Lauderdale Yankees players
Gulf Coast Yankees players
International League MVP award winners
Knights of the Order of Orange-Nassau
Liga de Béisbol Profesional Roberto Clemente outfielders
Major League Baseball first basemen
Major League Baseball hitting coaches
Major League Baseball left fielders
Major League Baseball players from Curaçao
Major League Baseball right fielders
Major League Baseball third basemen
Mexican League baseball first basemen
Mexican League baseball left fielders
Mexican League baseball right fielders
Mexican League baseball shortstops
Mexican League baseball third basemen
Montreal Expos players
Newark Bears players
New York Mets coaches
New York Yankees players
Nippon Professional Baseball outfielders
Nippon Professional Baseball third basemen
Olympic baseball players of the Netherlands
Ottawa Lynx players
People from Willemstad
Pericos de Puebla players
Prince William Yankees players
San Francisco Giants coaches
Saraperos de Saltillo players
SSG Landers players
Tomateros de Culiacán players
Tucson Sidewinders players
World Baseball Classic managers
Yakult Swallows players
Yaquis de Obregón players